Events from the year 1976 in Taiwan. This year is numbered Minguo 65 according to the official Republic of China calendar.

Incumbents
 President – Yen Chia-kan
 Vice President – Chiang Ching-kuo
 Premier – Chiang Ching-kuo
 Vice Premier – Hsu Ching-chung

Events

September
 1 September – The establishment of Taiwan Institute of Economic Research.

October
 10 October – Wang Sing-nan sent a mail bomb to Chairman of Taiwan Provincial Government Hsieh Tung-min; as a result of the explosion, Hsieh lost a hand.

November
 27 November – The opening of Hsinchu CKS Baseball Stadium in North District, Hsinchu City.

Births
 24 March – Kuo Yi-feng, baseball player
 5 April – Su Chiao-hui, member of Legislative Yuan
 16 April – Shu Qi, actress
 24 July – Chiang Peng-lung, table tennis player
 7 September – Wang Jing-li, baseball player
 22 September – Hsiao Huang-chi, singer, songwriter and judo athlete
 6 October – Barbie Hsu, actress and singer
 15 October – Chang Chen, actor
 16 October – Huang Chih-hsiung, member of 6th, 7th and 8th Legislative Yuan
 24 October – Yang Shih-kuang, television presenter
 27 October – Chen Chih-yuan, former professional baseball player
 31 October – Chang Tai-shan, professional baseball player
 28 November – Monster, guitarist
 4 December – Joelle Lu, actress

References

 
Years of the 20th century in Taiwan